Previš is a village in the municipality of Neum, Bosnia and Herzegovina.

Demographics 
According to the 2013 census, its population was 32, all Croats.

References

Populated places in Neum